Sphoeroides is a genus of pufferfishes.

Species
There are currently 22 recognized species in this genus:
 Sphoeroides andersonianus Morrow, 1957
 Sphoeroides angusticeps (Jenyns, 1842) (Narrow-headed puffer)
 Sphoeroides annulatus (Jenyns, 1842) (Bullseye puffer)
 Sphoeroides dorsalis Longley, 1934 (Marbled puffer)
 Sphoeroides georgemilleri Shipp, 1972
 Sphoeroides greeleyi C. H. Gilbert, 1900 (Green puffer)
 Sphoeroides kendalli Meek & Hildebrand, 1928 (Slick puffer)
 Sphoeroides lispus H. J. Walker, 1996 (Naked puffer)
 Sphoeroides lobatus (Steindachner, 1870) (Longnose puffer)
 Sphoeroides maculatus (Bloch & J. G. Schneider, 1801) (Northern puffer)
 Sphoeroides marmoratus (R. T. Lowe, 1838) (Guinean puffer)
 Sphoeroides nephelus (Goode & T. H. Bean, 1882) (Southern puffer)
 Sphoeroides nitidus Griffin, 1921
 Sphoeroides pachygaster (J. P. Müller & Troschel, 1848) (Blunthead puffer)
 Sphoeroides parvus Shipp & Yerger, 1969 (Least puffer)
 Sphoeroides rosenblatti W. A. Bussing, 1996
 Sphoeroides sechurae Hildebrand, 1946 (Peruvian puffer)
 Sphoeroides spengleri (Bloch, 1785) (Bandtail puffer)
 Sphoeroides testudineus (Linnaeus, 1758) (Checkered puffer)
 Sphoeroides trichocephalus (Cope, 1870) (Pygmy puffer)
 Sphoeroides tyleri Shipp, 1972 (Bearded puffer)
 Sphoeroides yergeri Shipp, 1972 (Speckled puffer)

References

Tetraodontidae
Fish of Japan
Marine fish genera
Taxa named by Bernard Germain de Lacépède